Kim Sang-sik (born 17 December 1976) is a South Korean football manager and former player. He is currently the manager of K League 1 club Jeonbuk Hyundai Motors. During his playing career, he played for South Korean national team as a centre-back or a defensive midfielder.

Career statistics

Club

International
Results list South Korea's goal tally first.

Honours

Player
Seongnam FC
K League 1: 2001, 2002, 2006
Korean FA Cup: 1999
Korean League Cup: 2002
Korean Super Cup: 2002

Jeonbuk Hyundai Motors
K League 1: 2009, 2011
AFC Champions League runner-up: 2011

South Korea
AFC Asian Cup third place: 2000, 2007

Individual
K League 1 Best XI: 2009

Manager
Jeonbuk Hyundai Motors
K League 1: 2021
Korean FA Cup: 2022

Individual
K League 1 Manager of the Year: 2021
Korean FA Coach of the Year: 2021
Korean FA Cup Best Manager: 2022

References

External links
 Kim Sang-sik at KFA 
 
 
 

1976 births
Living people
Association football midfielders
South Korean footballers
South Korea international footballers
Seongnam FC players
Gimcheon Sangmu FC players
Jeonbuk Hyundai Motors players
K League 1 players
2000 AFC Asian Cup players
2002 CONCACAF Gold Cup players
2006 FIFA World Cup players
2007 AFC Asian Cup players
Footballers at the 2000 Summer Olympics
Olympic footballers of South Korea
Sportspeople from South Jeolla Province